Machines at War 3 is a real-time strategy video game developed by Isotope 244 and published in September 2012 for Windows and on November 10, 2012 for Mac OS X.  It is the direct successor of Land Air Sea Warfare and is the third part of Machines at War.

Gameplay 

The gameplay is inspired by the seminal real-time strategy game series Command & Conquer. Where its direct predecessor Land Sea Warfare added naval units, Machines at War 3 adds infantry units, campaign missions and the long anticipated online multiplayer mode to the Machines at War series.

Reception

References 

JOYViews Machines at War 3 review
Community Discord Server 

Real-time strategy video games
2012 video games
MacOS games
Multiplayer and single-player video games
Video games developed in the United States
Windows games